Valhalla Rising may refer to:

 Valhalla Rising (novel), a 2001 novel by Clive Cussler
 Valhalla Rising (film), a 2009 film directed by Nicolas Winding Refn